Shailesh Nayak (born 21 August 1953) is an Indian scientist and is currently Director of the National Institute of Advanced Studies and Distinguished Scientist in the Ministry of Earth Sciences. He was the Chair of the Earth System Science Organization (ESSO) and Secretary to the Government of India for Ministry of Earth Sciences(MoES) Indian government, between August 2008 – 2015. He was also the Chairman of Earth Commission in India. He served as the interim chairman of ISRO between 31 December 2014 and 11 January 2015.

He has also served as director of the Indian National Centre for Ocean Information Services, INCOIS, Hyderabad, India, an autonomous institution under ESSO (May 2006 to July 2008). At ESSO-INCOIS, he set up a state-of-the-art Early Warning System for Tsunami and Storm Surges in the Indian Ocean. He was responsible for the conceptualization and development of Marine GIS. He made outstanding contributions in improving advisory services related to potential fishing zones, ocean state forecast, and Indian Argo project.

He has been providing leadership for the programs related to science of climate change, weather services, polar science, ocean science and modeling, ocean survey, resources, and technology. He chaired an expert group and helped to establish a national GIS in the country.

Personal life
Nayak was born on August 21, 1953, at Billimora, Navsari in Gujarat. He did his Ph.D. in geology in 1980 from M. S. University of Baroda, Vadodara and specialized in Oceanography, Remote sensing. He has also served in ISRO, his area of research includes Coastal and Ocean processes and ocean-atmosphere interaction, coastal geomorphology, hazards. He was honoured with an Honorary Doctorate of Science by Andhra University in 2011 and Assam University in 2013. He is recognized as a Ph.D. Guide by six Universities, and six students have obtained Ph.D. under his supervision. He has published more than 100 papers in journals, conferences and reports. On August 31, 2015, he relinquished his post of Secretary of Ministry of Earth Sciences, Indian Government.

Positions held 
He has served ISRO and MoES in several capacities namely:
 2014 - Chairman, Indian Space Research Organisation (ISRO)
 2008 - Secretary, Ministry of Earth Sciences (MoES) and Chairman, Earth Commission, India
 2006 - Director, Indian National Centre for Ocean Information Services, INCOIS, Hyderabad
 2001 - Group director, Marine & Water Resources, Space Applications Centre, ISRO, Ahmedabad
 1978 - Joined Space Applications Centre, ISRO, Ahmedabad
He has held several key positions namely:
 Chair, Regional Integrated Multi-hazard Early Warning System (RIMES) and the Indian Ocean Observing System Resource Forum (IRF)
 President, Indian Meteorological Society (IMS)
 President, Indian Society of Geomatics (ISG)
 Vice-Chair, Inter-Governmental Coordinating Group on Indian Ocean Tsunami Warning System (ICG-IOTWS) (2007–2011)
 President, ISRS, Dehradun
 Chairman, Indian Ocean–Global Ocean Observing System (IO-GOOS) (2006–10)
 President, ISPRS Technical Commission (TC) IV on ‘Geo-databases and Digital Mapping’ for the term 2004-08

Academic and research activities
Following are the highlights of his career as a renowned scientist:
 Disaster management: Provided leadership to set up a state-of-the-art Tsunami Warning Centre within two years within stipulated time and cost. Interacted with fourteen institutes from four different ministries to develop entire tsunami warning system.
 Fishery service for social benefit: Developed methodology for potential fishing zones for saving fuel and time while at the Space Applications Centre (SAC) and continued to improve further while at INCOIS, both methodology and dissemination. Initiated tuna forecast on an experimental basis.
 Marine weather for safe navigation: Operationalized service related to ocean state (height and direction of wave and swell) for the entire Indian Ocean.
 Database organization: Conceptualised and developing Marine GIS for the country. A marine data centre has been established at INCOIS and data is being provided to web.
 Generation of database for coastal zone management: Created satellite-derived benchmark database in a systematic manner on coastal landforms, mangroves, coral reef and shoreline change, high and low tide lines for the entire Indian coast for the first time.
 Development of technique and algorithms: Developed techniques for identifying various coastal landforms, mangrove plant communities as well as high tide line and low tide line. Directed research in development of algorithms for retrieving the information on chlorophyll and coloured dissolved organic matter (CDOM) and other bio-geo-chemical parameters from the space-based satellite data. The software has been installed in about twenty agencies in the country to utilise Ocean Colour Monitor (OCM) data.

He has contributed immensely towards the advancement of research in Science and Technology in leading institutes of India in various capacities:
 Chairman of the Research Advisory Committee of the National Institute of Oceanography, Goa 
 Chairman of the Research Advisory Committee of the Centre for Earth Science Studies, Thiruvananthapuram 
 Chairman of the Research Advisory Committee of the Defence Terrain Research Laboratory, Delhi 
 Chair, Governing Board, Birbal Sahni Institute of Paleobotany, Lucknow 
 Member of many national committees related to earth science, coastal protection, mangrove, coral reef, and coastal zone management

Fellow and member of professional bodies 
Fellow, Indian Academy of Sciences, Bangalore 
Fellow, National Academy of Sciences, India, Allah Abad.
 Fellow, International Society of Photogrammetry and Remote Sensing (ISPRS), 2012
 Member, International Academy of Astronautics, Paris.
 Fellow, Indian Society of Remote Sensing (ISRS), 2011
 Fellow, Geological Society of India, Bangalore
 Fellow, Meteorological Society of India
 Life Member, Indian Society of Remote Sensing, Dehradun 
 Life Member, Indian Society of Geomatics, Ahmedabad 
 Life Member, Institution of Geoscientists (India), Hyderabad 
 Life Member, Mangrove Society of India, Goa
 Life Member, Astronautical Society of India, Bangalore
 Life Member, Meteorological Society of India, New Delhi

Honours and awards 
 Honorary Doctor of Science by Assam University, 2013
 Vikram Sarabhai Memorial Award 2012
 Honorary Doctor of Science by Andhra University, 2011
 Special Achievement in GIS (SAG) Award -2008, E.S.R.I., San Diego, USA (for Tsunami Warning Centre)
 Skotch Challenger Award for Security and Disaster Management, Jan. 2009 (for setting up Tsunami Warning Centre) by Skotch, New Delhi
 Bhaskara Award for 2009
 Gold Medal of Indian Geophysical Union 2009
 National Mineral Award-2005, (Applied Geology) Ministry of Mines, Govt. of India
 Indian National Remote Sensing Award for the Year 1994, Indian Society of Remote Sensing, Dehradun
 Hari-Om Ashram Prerit Inter-University Smarak Trust Prize for the Year 1981-82 for Geology
 Dinesh Chokshi Memorial prize for securing highest marks in M. Sc. (Geology) in 1975

References 

Indian oceanographers
Indian geologists
People from Navsari district
1953 births
Living people
20th-century Indian earth scientists
Scientists from Gujarat